The Baralia River is a sub-tributary of the Brahmaputra River in the Indian state of Assam. The Baralia river originates in the Lokhaitora River and flows through Nalbari district & Rangia Town before its confluence with the Puthimari River and the Brahmaputra river. The Nona River is a tributary of the Baralia river.

References 

Rivers of Assam
Rivers of India